Edmore Sibanda (born 3 June 1984) is a Zimbabwean footballer who plays as a goalkeeper for Golden Arrows and the Zimbabwe national football team.

References

External links

1984 births
Living people
Zimbabwean footballers
Zimbabwean expatriate footballers
Zimbabwe international footballers
CAPS United players
Gunners F.C. players
Witbank Spurs F.C. players
Lamontville Golden Arrows F.C. players
South African Premier Division players
National First Division players
Association football goalkeepers
2019 Africa Cup of Nations players
Zimbabwean expatriate sportspeople in South Africa
Expatriate soccer players in South Africa